Stein Mart  was an American discount men's and women's department store chain based in Jacksonville, Florida. Stein Mart had locations primarily in the Southeast, Texas, and California. Stein Mart stores sold recent trends in clothing for both men and women. Additionally, home decor, accessories, and shoes were all available at discounted prices.

In August 2020, the company announced that it had filed for Chapter 11 bankruptcy due to the COVID-19 pandemic, and that it planned to close all of its 279 stores. Stein Mart continues to operate as an online retailer, which is not related to the former company. 

On March 2, 2023, Retail Ecommerce Ventures, Stein Mart's current parent, announced that it was mulling a possible bankruptcy filing.

History

Stein Mart was founded in 1908 by Sam Stein, a Russian Jewish immigrant who opened his first store in Greenville, Mississippi; he had arrived there by steamboat from New York City three years before. The department store carried general merchandise until his son, Jake Stein, took over the company upon his father Sam's death in 1932. The store then redirected its focus toward discounted clothing.

The chain targeted customers who shopped department stores on a regular basis, inducing them to purchase goods by offering discounts of 25 to 60 percent off department store prices. By the late 1970s, Stein Mart had become a leading retailer of clothing for the family in the Mississippi Delta.

Under Jay Stein's leadership, Stein Mart grew from three stores in 1977 to 40 stores in 1990, and then to 123 stores by the end of 1996. In determining the prime locations for new Stein Mart stores, management targeted cities with populations of 125,000 or more and relied on demographic research regarding income, education, and occupation to help predict whether a community might support a discounter of designer merchandise.

In 2003, Stein Mart introduced the "Real Shopper" campaign with support from Orlando-based advertising agency, Fry Hammond Barr.  This multimedia advertising campaign features real Stein Mart shoppers chosen via casting calls held throughout the country.  Each season six to eight female shoppers are chosen to appear in the campaign and are featured in Stein Mart's Sisterhood book online.

In 2013, the company reported a profit of $25.6 million with operation of 260 stores in 29 states.

In October 2017, in response to the downward trend of the company's stock price, the company announced plans to improve its financials by cutting 10% of their corporate staff, trimming inventory by 15%, slashing $22 million from the prior year's capital expenses, and suspending the 4th quarter stock dividend.

In January 2018, Stein Mart announced that it would explore strategic alternatives for the company. In February 2020, Stein Mart entered into a deal to make the company private; its common stock would no longer be listed on any public stock market. The transaction is subject to approval by Stein Mart shareholders and was "expected to close in the first half of calendar year 2020."

Bankruptcy 
On August 12, 2020, Stein Mart filed for Chapter 11 bankruptcy due to the COVID-19 pandemic. Later, it was announced that all Stein Mart locations would be closing permanently.
All stores were closed by October 2020.

Leadership 
In 2002, Jay Stein stepped down as CEO but remained as chairman and the largest Stein Mart shareholder. John H. Williams Jr. served as vice chairman and chief executive officer of the company from September 2001 to February 2003 and still serves on the Stein Mart board.

Michael D. Fisher held the position of president and chief executive officer of the company from 2003 to August 2007. At that time, Fisher resigned and Linda McFarland Farthing was appointed as president and chief executive officer of Stein Mart. Farthing had been a longtime Stein Mart board member and held the president and CEO position for one year. Upon her resignation in 2008, David H. Stovall Jr., served as CEO until 2011. In September 2011, he announced his retirement, leaving Jay Stein to take over as the interim CEO.

On April 25, 2014, Stein Mart announced that the Board of Directors had created the Office of the President, appointing D. Hunt Hawkins and Brian R. Morrow to share the office.  Both reported to CEO Jay Stein. Hawkins had been with the company for 20 years, starting as Senior Vice President of Human Resources and COO since December 2011.  Morrow joined Stein Mart as Chief Merchandising Officer in February 2010 after holding similar positions with Macy's North/Marshall, Mervyn's and Macy's West.

On March 15, 2016, Stein Mart named Dawn Robertson as CEO, replacing Jay Stein. Robertson resigned as CEO in September 2016 at which time D. Hunt Hawkins was named Interim CEO.

On January 26, 2017, the company announced the appointment of MaryAnne Morin as president and "interim" was removed from the CEO title of D. Hunt Hawkins.

When Stein Mart's Director of Stores Gary Pierce requested early retirement on May 1, 2018, he agreed to remain with the company until the end of February 2019. The Form 8-K filed by Stein Mart stated that Executive Vice President Pierce would stay, “in order to provide for an orderly transition of his duties”.

Brick-and-mortar operations 

Stein Mart sold clothes for women and men as well as home décor, accessories, and shoes. Each store had about 30 employees.

Stein Mart expanded their home department in 2010, adding houseware and décor for the house. The "Boutique" portion of the store offered women special occasion clothing. The "Attitudes" section of the store carried clothing for women.

For decades Stein Mart leased its shoe department to other retailers, such as DSW Shoe Warehouse. In 2010, Stein Mart started working with Perfumania in 2010 to stock an assortment of fragrances.

In October 2010, due to popular demand by Stein Mart shoppers, the retailer began offering limited online shopping with Ship from Store for shorter delivery times.

References

External links 
 

 Stein Mart - Encyclopedia of Mississippi - University of Mississippi

American companies established in 1908
Retail companies established in 1908
Defunct department stores based in Florida
Discount stores of the United States
Companies based in Jacksonville, Florida
Companies formerly listed on the Nasdaq
Jacksonville Modern architecture
1908 establishments in Mississippi
Greenville, Mississippi
Companies disestablished due to the COVID-19 pandemic
Companies that filed for Chapter 11 bankruptcy in 2020
Companies that have filed for Chapter 7 bankruptcy
American companies disestablished in 2020
Retail companies disestablished in 2020